Feed the Fire is the fourth studio album by Timothy B. Schmit, released in 2001.

Production
The album was produced by Schmit and Mark Hudson; it was recorded at Schmit's home studio. It contains a cover of Bob Dylan's "To Make You Feel My Love". "You Are Everything" is a cover of the song made famous by the Stylistics. Joe Walsh guested on Feed the Fire.

Critical reception

The Los Angeles Times wrote that "there's modest warmth rather than roaring fire from the Eagles' bassist, whose first solo album in 11 years is steeped in '70s R&B- tinged classic rock a' la you know who." The Birmingham Mail called the album "easy on the ear, country-flavoured soft-rock which sounds great on the open road with the top down and the wind in your hair." The Sacramento Bee deemed it "a solid showcase for Schmit's musical talents, from svelte vocal harmonies to polished songwriting."

Track listing and personnel
"The Shadow" (Timothy B. Schmit) - 4:22
 Scott Crago – drums, percussion 
 Timothy B. Schmit – all vocals, keyboards, guitars, bass 

 "Every Song Is You" (Steve Dudas, Dean Grakal, Mark Hudson) - 4:09
 Scott Crago – drums, percussion 
 Timothy B. Schmit – lead and backing vocals, bass
 Mark Hudson – acoustic guitar, backing vocals 
 Steve Dudas – electric guitar, acoustic guitar 

 "Make You Feel My Love" (Bob Dylan) - 3:47
 Timothy B. Schmit – all vocals, bass 
 Hank Linderman – keyboards, acoustic guitars, EBow

 "I'll Always Let You In" (Timothy B. Schmit, Mark Hudson, Steve Dudas, Dean Grakal) - 4:01
 Scott Crago – drums, percussion 
 Timothy B. Schmit – lead and backing vocals bass
 Mark Hudson – acoustic guitar, backing vocals 
 Steve Dudas – electric guitar, acoustic guitar
 Joe Walsh – lead electric guitar 
 Jim Cox – keyboards

 "Running" (Mark Hudson, Sander Selover) - 4:41
 Scott Crago – drums, percussion 
 Timothy B. Schmit – lead and backing vocals, bass 
 Mark Hudson – acoustic guitar, backing vocals 
 Steve Dudas – electric guitar, acoustic guitar 
 Jim Cox – keyboards 

 "I'm Not Angry Anymore" (Timothy B. Schmit, Stan Lynch) - 4:15
 Timothy B. Schmit – vocals, acoustic guitars, bass 
 Hank Linderman – electric guitars
 Richard Feldman – loops
 Cameo and Stan Lynch – "Who's Angry?" voices

 "Give Me Back My Sight" (Timothy B. Schmit, Hank Linderman) - 4:30
 Timothy B. Schmit – all vocals, bass 
 Hank Linderman – keyboards, acoustic guitars, electric guitars 
 Cameron Stone – cello 
 Richard Feldman – loops 

 "You Are Everything" (Thom Bell, Linda Creed) - 3:50
 Timothy B. Schmit – all vocals, bass, tambourine
 Hank Linderman – keyboards, guitars 
 East West – loops

 "Top Of The Stairs" (Timothy B. Schmit, Darrell Brown, Peterson) - 3:43
 Timothy B. Schmit – all vocals 

 "Moment Of Truth" (Timothy B. Schmit, Dean Grakal, Steve Dudas, Mark Hudson) - 3:26
 Scott Crago – drums, percussion 
 Timothy B. Schmit – lead and backing vocals, acoustic guitar, bass 
 Mark Hudson – acoustic guitar, backing vocals 
 Steve Dudas – electric guitar, acoustic guitar 
 Jim Cox – keyboards 

 "Song For Owen" (Timothy B. Schmit, W.G. Snuffy Walden, Hank Linderman) - 4:11
 Timothy B. Schmit – acoustic guitar, bass, string arrangements
 Adam Benjamin – keyboards 
 Stefanie Fife – cello
 Novi Novog – viola, string arrangements
 Robin Lorentz – violin

Production 
 Tracks 1, 3 & 6-9 produced by Timothy B. Schmit, except Tracks 2, 4, 5 & 10 produced by Mark Hudson.
 Engineered by Scott Gordon, Eric Greedy, Mark Hudson, Rob Jacobs, Hank Linderman and Timothy B. Schmit.
 Recorded at Mooselodge (Calabasas, California) and Whatinthewhatthe? Studio (Los Angeles, California).
 Mixed by Scott Gordon and Hank Linderman at American Recording Co. (Calabasas, California).
 Mastered by Joe Gastwirt at Ocean View Digital Mastering (Los Angeles, California).

References

2001 albums
Timothy B. Schmit albums